Peltigera is a genus of approximately 100 species of foliose lichens in the family Peltigeraceae. Commonly known as the dog or pelt lichens, species of Peltigera are often terricolous (growing on soil), but can also occur on moss, trees, rocks, and many other substrates in many parts of the world.

Most species of Peltigera have the cyanobacterium Nostoc as the dominant photobiont but some have the algae Coccomyxa. The presence of both a green alga and a cyanobacterium makes some tripartite; in this case they show cephalodium growths containing the third partner, Nostoc. Because of their ability to fix nitrogen from the atmosphere, such lichens are influential in soil composition and generation.

Description

Species of Peltigera are foliose, with broad lobed thalli. Although the size of the thalli is variable and species-dependent, in some species the thalli can grow quite large, up to 30 cm in diameter.  The color of the upper surface may range from drab gray, brown or greenish. Lower surfaces are typically without a cortex (unlike other foliose lichens), and cottony, often with fungal hyphae fused to form a network of veins. The reproductive structures isidia, soredia or lobules may be present in some species. All species of Peltigera associate with the nitrogen-fixing cyanobacteria Nostoc.

Peltigera can be distinguished from the equally large and leaf-like lichen, Nephroma, by its veined lower cortex; Nephroma, by contrast, has a smooth, unveiled lower cortex.

Habitat

Peltigera are mainly ground-dwelling, but can also be found on mosses or dead wood. Some species are used as forest succession indicators.

Taxonomy

In 1753, Linnaeus first described the species Lichen apthosus and L. caninus back when all known lichens were grouped into the genus Lichen. Later, in 1787, Willdenow circumscribed the genus Peltigera, and redescribed P. aphthosa and P. canina.

The generic name is derived from the Latin language pelta (small shield), and refers to the shield-shaped thallus in these species. The common name, the dog lichen, refers to the perceived resemblance of P. caninus to a dog.

Phylogeny

In a comparative analysis of both morphological and chemical characteristics as well as sequences of large subunit nuclear ribosomal DNA, it was shown that the genus Peltigera is monophyletic. Several species, such as P. canina, have been changed to a group as there appears to be several species clustered under a single name.

Distribution

The Peltigera have a widespread distribution, and are found on all continents. There are 34 North American species, 30 European species, 25 species from South America, and 16 species from New Zealand.

Species

Peltigera aphthosa 
Peltigera aquatica 
Peltigera britannica 
Peltigera canina 
Peltigera castanea 
Peltigera chionophila 
Peltigera collina 
Peltigera degenii 
Peltigera didactyla 
Peltigera dilacerata 
Peltigera dolichorhiza 
Peltigera elisabethae 
Peltigera extenuata 
Peltigera fimbriata 
Peltigera gowardii 
Peltigera granulosa 
Peltigera horizontalis 
Peltigera hydrophila 
Peltigera hydrothyria 
Peltigera hymenina 
Peltigera isidiophora 
Peltigera islandica 
Peltigera koponenii 
Peltigera lactucifolia 
Peltigera lairdii 
Peltigera latiloba 
Peltigera lepidophora 
Peltigera leptoderma 
Peltigera leucophlebia 
Peltigera malacea 
Peltigera membranacea 
Peltigera montis-wilhelmii 
Peltigera neckeri 
Peltigera neodegenii 
Peltigera neorufescens 
Peltigera papuana 
Peltigera polydactylon 
Peltigera ponojensis 
Peltigera praetextata 
Peltigera pulverulenta 
Peltigera pusilla 
Peltigera rufescens 
Peltigera scabrosa 
Peltigera scabrosella 
Peltigera seneca 
Peltigera serusiauxii 
Peltigera shennongjiana  – China
Peltigera sorediifera 
Peltigera subhorizontalis 
Peltigera tartarea 
Peltigera tereziana 
Peltigera vainioi 
Peltigera venosa 
Peltigera weberi 
Peltigera wulingensis

Uses

Peltigera species has been used historically to treat wounds, urinary disorders, thrush, tuberculosis, and rabies. P. apthosa was used as a remedy for cough and infantile aphthae.
P. furfuracea has shown potent antioxidant activity and reducing power. Similarly, Peltigera specimens from Hawaii and Iceland have also been reported to show pronounced antioxidant activity.

Food source
Although a few reports have described caribou and reindeer feeding on the thalli of Peltigera, in general, species of Peltigera are not commonly used as a food source by mammals. A study of the grazing habits of the land snails Cantareus aspersa and Limax species revealed that these snails prefer to eat Peltigera species (such as P. praetextata) that are lacking in secondary metabolites.

Bioactive compounds

Peltigera leucophlebia contains the compounds tenuiorin and methyl orsellinate, which are inhibitory to the enzyme 15-lipoxygenase. Tenuiorin is also known to occur in P. apthosa, P. malacea and P. neckeri. A mixture of methyl and ethyl orsellinates have been identified from P. aphthosa that had antibacterial activity against Gram-positive and -negative bacteria. The novel non-protein amino acids solorinine and peltigerine have been detected in various species of Peltigera.

References

Further reading
Gilbert, O. Lichens Naturally Scottish. 2004. Scottish Natural Heritage. 

Lichen genera
 
Peltigerales genera
Taxa described in 1787
Taxa named by Carl Ludwig Willdenow